A by-election was held for the Australian House of Representatives seat of Higinbotham on 10 December 1960. This was triggered by the death of Frank Timson.

The by-election was won, though narrowly, by Liberal candidate Don Chipp.

Results

Frank Timson died.

References

1960 elections in Australia
Victorian federal by-elections
1960s in Victoria (Australia)
December 1960 events in Australia